Ceralocyna variegata is a species of beetle in the family Cerambycidae. It was described by Monné & Napp in 1999.

References

Ceralocyna
Beetles described in 1999